Anaplecta is a genus in the family Anaplectidae. There are at least 20 described species in Anaplecta.

Species

References

Blattodea genera
Insects described in 1862